Crosby is an unincorporated community in McKean County, Pennsylvania, United States. Crosby has a post office with ZIP code 16724.

References

Unincorporated communities in McKean County, Pennsylvania
Unincorporated communities in Pennsylvania